John Robinson (7 November 1650 – 11 April 1723) was an English diplomat and prelate.

Early life
Robinson was born at Cleasby, North Yorkshire, near Darlington, a son of John Robinson (died 1651) a cooper by trade and Elizabeth Potter. Educated at Brasenose College, Oxford, he became a fellow of Oriel College, and in about 1680 he became chaplain to the British embassy to Stockholm. He remained in Sweden for nearly thirty years. During the absence of the minister, Philip Warwick, Robinson acted as resident and as envoy extraordinary, and he was thus in Sweden during a very interesting and important period, and was performing diplomatic duties at a time when the affairs of northern Europe were attracting an unusual amount of attention.

Among his adventures, not the least noteworthy was his journey to Narva with Charles XII in 1700.

Career

In 1709 Robinson returned to England, and was appointed Dean of Windsor and of Wolverhampton; in 1710 he was elected bishop of Bristol, and among other ecclesiastical positions he held that of Dean of the Chapel Royal. In August 1711 he became Lord Privy Seal, this being, says Lord Stanhope, "the last time that a bishop has been called upon to fill a political office." Echoing his Scandinavian connections, the motto on his coat of arms is written in runic characters.

In 1712 the bishop represented Great Britain at the important congress of Utrecht, and as first plenipotentiary, he signed the treaty of Utrecht in April 1713 that ended the War of the Spanish Succession. Just after his return to England he was chosen Bishop of London in succession to Henry Compton.

In 1718 he fostered a plan for the union of the English and Swedish churches, supported by Count Gyllenberg, Swedish Ambassador to London. The plan fell through because of the opposition of most Swedish bishops, although Svedberg of Skara and Gezelius, Bishop of Turku (Finland) were in favour. The reason for the opposition was that the Church of England was too Calvinist for them.

He died at Hampstead, having been a great benefactor to Oriel College, and is buried at All Saints Church, Fulham, London.

He married twice but had no issue by either marriage. His first wife was Mary Langton, daughter of William Langton. His second wife was Emma Cornwallis, widow of Thomas Cornwallis of Abermarlais and daughter of Sir Job Charlton, 1st Baronet and his second wife Letitia. Emma outlived him by many years, and died in 1748.

Writings
Robinson wrote an Account of Sweden together with an Extract of the History of that Kingdom. By a person of note who resided many years there (London, 1695). This was translated into French (Amsterdam, 1712), and in 1738 was published with Viscount Molesworth's Account of Denmark in 1692. Some of his letters are among the Strafford papers in the British Museum.

Other
A member of the same family was Sir Frederick Philipse Robinson  Robinson's older brother, Christopher Robinson, immigrated to the Virginia Colony and became the patriarch of one of Virginia's First Families. He is also related to Christopher Robinson and the Robinson political family of Upper Canada.

References

John Robinson's Account of Sweden, 1688: the original 1688 manuscript, edited and collated with the 1693 manuscript and the published editions from 1694, with an introduction by John B. Hattendorf. (Stockholm, Sweden: Karolinska Förbundet, 1998)

1650 births
1723 deaths
18th-century Church of England bishops
Alumni of Brasenose College, Oxford
Bishops of Bristol
Bishops of London
Ambassadors of England to Sweden
English diplomats
Chancellors of the College of William & Mary
Deans of Windsor
Deans of the Chapel Royal
Fellows of Oriel College, Oxford
17th century in Sweden
Lords Privy Seal
People from Richmondshire (district)
Clergy from Yorkshire
17th-century English diplomats
18th-century diplomats
Burials at All Saints Church, Fulham